Griffin is a city in and the county seat of Spalding County, Georgia. It is part of the Atlanta metropolitan area. As of the 2020 census, the city had a population of 23,478.

Griffin was founded in 1840 and named for landowner Col. Lewis Lawrence Griffin.

Griffin Technical College was located in Griffin from 1963 and a branch of Southern Crescent Technical College is in Griffin. The Griffin Synodical Female College was established by Presbyterians, but closed. The University of Georgia maintains a branch campus in Griffin.

History
The Macon and Western Railroad was extended to a new station in Griffin in 1842.
 
In 1938, Alma Lovell had been distributing religious Bible tracts as a Jehovah's Witness but was arrested for violating a city ordinance requiring prior permission for distributing literature. In Lovell v. City of Griffin, the U.S. Supreme Court found that the city had violated her First Amendment and Fourteenth Amendment rights.

The Griffin Commercial Historic District (among the National Register of Historic Places listings in Spalding County, Georgia) is generally bounded by Central Alley, Sixth Street, Taylor Street and Eighth Street. The district includes the Griffin Grocery Company Building, now the Griffin Regional Welcome Center.

The western part of the city was heavily damaged by an EF3 tornado on January 12, 2023. The tornado was one of four that were on the ground simultaneously in the area. This particular tornado injured 18 people along its path.

Geography
Griffin is located at  (33.247602, -84.270891).

Demographics

2020 census

As of the 2020 United States census, there were 23,478 people, 8,945 households, and 5,347 families residing in the city.

2000 census
As of the census of 2000, there were 23,451 people, 8,876 households, and 5,955 families residing in the city. The racial makeup of the city was 49.88% African American, 46.98% White, 0.17% Native American, 0.99% Asian, 0.03% Pacific Islander, 0.98% from other races, and 0.98% from two or more races. Hispanic or Latino people of any race were 2.22% of the population.

There were 8,876 households, out of which 33.0% had children under the age of 18 living with them, 38.1% were married couples living together, 24.1% had a female householder with no husband present, and 32.9% were non-families. 27.7% of all households were made up of individuals, and 11.1% had someone living alone who was 65 years of age or older. The average household size was 2.60 and the average family size was 3.17.

In the city, the population was spread out, with 28.7% under the age of 18, 9.8% from 18 to 24, 28.9% from 25 to 44, 18.8% from 45 to 64, and 13.8% who were 65 years of age or older. The median age was 33 years. For every 100 females, there were 86.3 males. For every 100 females age 18 and over, there were 80.2 males.

The median income for a household in the city was $30,088, and the median income for a family was $33,963. Males had a median income of $30,488 versus $21,352 for females. The per capita income for the city was $15,563. About 17.7% of families and 21.4% of the population were below the poverty line, including 28.4% of those under age 18 and 16.0% of those ages of 65 or over.

Education
The Griffin-Spalding County School District holds grades pre-school to grade twelve and consists of eleven elementary schools, four middle schools, and three high schools. The district has 661 full-time teachers and over 10,648 students.
Griffin Technical College was located in Griffin from 1963 and, following a merger, a branch of Southern Crescent Technical College is in Griffin. The Griffin Synodical Female College was established by Presbyterians, but closed.

The University of Georgia maintains a branch campus in Griffin.
Griffin Region College and Career Academy are located within the city limits. The GRCCA prepares students for college and careers through actual college courses for both high school and college credits. The popular Civil Air Patrol aerospace education program promotes aerospace, aviation and STEM-related careers with standards-based, hands-on curriculum and activities.

Sports and recreation

The Spalding County Pickleball Association (SCPA) is located at Wyomia Tyus Olympic Park. The SCPA operates, develops and manages programs at the Spalding County Pickleball Complex. The courts are open to the public.

Spalding County Special Olympics Bowling Team bowls every Thursday afternoon from September through March at Magnolia Lanes bowling alley.

The Spalding County Leisure Services Department offers youth sports programs including baseball, basketball, fast pitch softball, soccer, and swimming. For adults, Spalding County offers softball, kickball, and Adult Basketball Leagues: Men's Open and Men's Industrial.

There are at least 21 golf courses within 20 miles of the center of Griffin.

Spalding County was named disc golf capital of the southeast, being home to four courses.

The Griffin Warriors, a World Basketball Association team, played at the high school in 2006.

Griffin, during the "golden ages" of baseball, hosted several minor league Class D level teams:

Griffin Lightfoots, (1915–1916), Griffin Griffs, (1917) - Georgia-Alabama League 
Griffin - Georgia State League (1920, 1921)
Griffin Pimientos (1947–1949, 1951) (Class D affiliate of the St. Louis Browns), Griffin Tigers (1950) - Georgia-Alabama League

Media
The Griffin Daily News is a local paper, founded in 1872.

WMVV is a local Christian station, while WKEU (AM) broadcasts oldies. WYFK, a Christian station, has their W290AG translator in Griffin. University of Georgia Griffin Campus has a news radio station on 88.9FM or live streaming at wkeuradio.com.

Notable people

Bill Anderson - country singer; born in South Carolina and grew up in Griffin
Edward Andrews - film and television actor; born in Griffin
Lewis White Beck - philosopher, translator, textbook author, and scholar of German philosophy; born in Griffin
Tim Beckham - professional baseball player; first overall pick in 2008 Major League Baseball draft after attending Griffin High School; born in Griffin
Brian Bohannon - head football coach at Kennesaw State; previously played wide receiver for UGA and held a number of assistant coaching positions
James S. Boynton - politician and jurist; briefly served as the 51st Governor of Georgia from 1883 after the death of governor Alexander Stephens; born in Henry County, Georgia and moved to Griffin in 1865; buried in Oak Hill Cemetery in Griffin
Jody Breeze - rapper
Thomas Jefferson Byrd - actor
Charlie Clemons - football player who played for several different National Football League teams; member of the St. Louis Rams team that won Super Bowl XXXIV; uncle of Nic Clemons and Chris Clemons
Chris Clemons - NFL defensive end and brother of Nic Clemons; played college football for University of Georgia; member of Super Bowl XLVIII champion Seattle Seahawks
Nic Clemons - defensive end for the Denver Broncos
Elbert Dubenion - football player; wide receiver for the Buffalo Bills
Rick Dyer - Bigfoot enthusiast known for high-profile hoaxes
John J. Eagan - industrialist and co-founder of the American Cast Iron Pipe Company
Jack Flynt - lawyer and U.S. Congressman from Spalding County; born in Griffin
Willie Gault - NFL wide receiver and Olympic athlete; played 11 seasons for the Chicago Bears and Los Angeles Raiders
Nick Hamilton - pro wrestling referee
Darrin Hancock - basketball player; played with the 1993 Final Four University of Kansas, the NBA, and various minor league teams after graduating from Griffin High School
Doc Holliday - figure of the American West and friend of Wyatt Earp; born in Griffin
John McIntosh Kell - Executive Officer of the CSS Alabama; served as Adjutant General of Georgia; born in Darien, Georgia; lived in Griffin in his later life until his death in 1900
Jan Kemp - academic who exposed the allowing of nine college football players to pass a remedial English course at UGA
Sidney Lanier - poet, lawyer and musician; lived in Griffin as a child after his birth in Macon; he wrote the poem "Corn" in Sunnyside, several miles north of Griffin
Lauren-Ashley - country singer
Sonia Leigh - country singer-songwriter; attended Griffin High School
Sherrod Martin - former NFL defensive back for the Carolina Panthers
Karen Mathiak - chiropractor and Georgia state legislator
Josh Pace - Syracuse University basketball guard during the school's first National Championship in 2003; currently plays professional basketball overseas
Bobby Rainey - running back for the Tampa Bay Buccaneers and in college for Western Kentucky
Henry L. Sherman - lawyer and judge; grew up in Griffin
Kyle Stemberger - record producer
Ben Talley - football player
Dox Thrash - printmaker and painter, helped invent carborundum technique; born in Griffin in 1893
Stephen J. Townsend - U.S. Army general; graduate of Griffin High School
Jessie Tuggle - football linebacker who played his entire career with the Atlanta Falcons; played in college at Valdosta State after graduating from Griffin High School
Wyomia Tyus - athlete, Olympic gold medalist, first woman to retain the Olympic title in the 100; born in Griffin
Rayfield Wright - Hall of Fame offensive tackle (born in Griffin); played in college at Fort Valley State
John P. Yates - Georgia state legislator

Culture 

The Griffin Ballet Theatre was founded in 1994.

The Main Street Players professional theater was founded in 2001.

The Griffin Museum is located upstairs in the Welcome Center and contains an array of Griffin artifacts and memorabilia, including some dating from the mid-1800s.

Griffin Choral Arts, founded in 2007, is a 50-voice auditioned regional community chorus that performs four major concerts each season.

Griffin Music Club was founded in 1942, and is affiliated with the National Federation of Music Clubs (NFMC).

The Griffin Area Concert Association was founded in 1969. It presents performances by national and international performing artists featuring dance, musical theater, solo instrumentalists, vocal, string or brass ensembles and other performing arts.

Griffin Spalding Historical Society was founded in 1969. Its headquarter is in the Bailey-Tebault House houses at Meriwether Street, of which it provides tours.

The Griffin-Spalding Athletic Hall of Fame was founded in 1983.

Since 1962 the city has presented an early annual Christmas parade, with floats and marching bands, presented by the Southside Riders.

Kiwanis of Griffin was founded in 1940.

In downtown Griffin there is a haunted house attraction, the Sinister Suites Haunted Hotel. It was built in 1910, and after being closed in the 1970s was re-opened as a haunted attraction during October. It features a five-story, 60,000-square foot walk-through of the hotel.

Griffin has been featured or used as a production site in many films and television shows.

References

External links

 Official website
 Griffin Spalding Chamber of Commerce

 
Cities in Georgia (U.S. state)
Cities in Spalding County, Georgia
County seats in Georgia (U.S. state)
Cities in the Atlanta metropolitan area